Vincent Masekesa (born 27 March 1997) is a Zimbabwean cricketer. He made his first-class debut on 30 March 2021, for Mountaineers, in the 2020–21 Logan Cup.

References

External links
 

1997 births
Living people
Zimbabwean cricketers
Mountaineers cricketers
Place of birth missing (living people)